An index of articles related to the Russian Revolution and the Russian Civil War period (1905–1922). It covers articles on topics, events, and persons related to the revolutionary era, from the 1905 Russian Revolution until the end of the Russian Civil War. The See also section includes other lists related to Revolutionary Russia and the Soviet Union, including an index of articles about the Soviet Union (1922–1991) which is the next article in this series, and Bibliography of the Russian Revolution and Civil War.

0–9

 1917 Russian Constituent Assembly election
 1905 Russian Revolution
 26 Baku Commissars

 Return to Table of Contents

A 

 Abdication of Nicholas II
 Alexandrovich, Michael
 Allied intervention in the Russian Civil War
 All-Russian Central Executive Committee of the Soviets of Workers' and Soldiers' Deputies
 All-Russian Congress of Soviets
 All-Russian Congress of Soviets of Workers' and Soldiers' Deputies
 All-Russian Central Executive Committee of the Soviets of Workers' and Soldiers' Deputies
 First All-Russian Congress of Soviets of Workers' and Soldiers' Deputies
 Second All-Russian Congress of Soviets of Workers' and Soldiers' Deputies
 Third All-Russian Congress of Workers', Soldiers' and Peasants Deputies' Soviets
 All-Russian Executive Committee of the Union of Railwaymen
 All-Russian Council for Workers' Control
 All-Russian Democratic Conference
 American Expeditionary Force, North Russia
 American Expeditionary Force, Siberia
 Andreyeva, Maria Fyodorovna
 April Crisis
 April Theses
 Armand, Inessa
 Armed Forces of South Russia
 Armenian Soviet Socialist Republic
 Avksentiev, Nikolai
 Axelrod, Pavel
 Azef, Yevno
 Azerbaijan Soviet Socialist Republic

 Return to Table of Contents

B 

 Basmachi movement
 Battle for the Donbass (1919)
 Battle of Tsaritsyn
 Bloody Sunday (1905)
 Blumkin, Yakov
 Bogdanov, Alexander
 Bolsheviks
 Bolshevization of the Soviets
 Bourgeoisie
 Bukharin, Nikolai
 Bulygin, Alexander
 Bureau of the Central Committee of the Russian Communist Party (bolsheviks)
 Byelorussian Soviet Socialist Republic

 Return to Table of Contents

C 

 Canadian Siberian Expeditionary Force
 Central Committee of the Baltic Fleet
 Central Executive Committee of the Navy
 Centrocaspian Dictatorship
 Cheka
 Chernov, Viktor
 Chernyshevsky, Nikolay
 Committee for the Salvation of the Homeland and Revolution
 Constitutional Democratic Party
 Congress of the Communist Party of the Soviet Union
 6th Congress of the Russian Social Democratic Labour Party (Bolsheviks) (1917)
 7th Congress of the Russian Communist Party (Bolsheviks) (1918)
 8th Congress of the Russian Communist Party (Bolsheviks) (1919)
 9th Congress of the Russian Communist Party (Bolsheviks) (1920)
 10th Congress of the Russian Communist Party (Bolsheviks) (1921)
 11th Congress of the Russian Communist Party (Bolsheviks) (1922)
 Committee of Members of the Constituent Assembly
 Communist International
 Second International
 Communist Manifesto, The
 Communist party
 Communist symbolism
 Council of Labor and Defense
 Council of People's Commissars
 Culture of the Soviet Union
 Czechoslovak Legion

 Return to Table of Contents

D 

 Declaration of the Rights of the Peoples of Russia
 Decree on Land
 Decree on Peace
 Democratic centralism
 Denikin, Anton
 Dictatorship of the proletariat
 Directorate (Russia)
 Dual power
 Duma
 Dzerzhinsky, Felix

 Return to Table of Contents

E 

 Early life of Vladimir Lenin
 Eastern Front of the Russian Civil War
 Eisenstein, Sergei
 Engels, Friedrich
 Evacuation of Novorossiysk (1920)
 Evacuation of the Crimea (1920)
 Execution of the Romanov family
 Executive Committee of the Petrograd Soviet

 Return to Table of Contents

F

 Far Eastern Front in the Russian Civil War
 February Revolution

 Return to Table of Contents

G 

 General Jewish Labour Bund
 Gapon, Georgy
 Georgian Soviet Socialist Republic
 Golitsyn, Nikolai
 Goremykin, Ivan
 Gorky, Maxim
 Green armies
 Guchkov, Alexander

 Return to Table of Contents

H 

 Hammer and sickle
 Harbin Soviet
 House of Romanov

 Return to Table of Contents

I 

 Ice March
 Imperialism, the Highest Stage of Capitalism
 Internationale
 International Workingmen's Association
 Ispolkom

 Return to Table of Contents]

J 

 Jailbirds of Kerensky
 Japanese intervention in Siberia
 Joseph Stalin in the Russian Revolution, Russian Civil War, and Polish–Soviet War
 July Days
 Junker mutiny

 Return to Table of Contents

K 

 Kaledin, Alexey
 Kalinin, Mikhail
 Kamenev, Lev
 Kerensky, Alexander
 Kerensky–Krasnov uprising
 Khabalov, Sergey Semyonovich
 Kyiv or Kiev
 Kiev Arsenal January Uprising
 Kiev Bolshevik Uprising
 Kokovtsov, Vladimir
 Kolchak, Alexander
 Kornilov affair
 Kornilov, Lavr
 Krestinsky, Nikolay
 Kronstadt
 Kronstadt mutinies
 Kronstadt rebellion
 Krupskaya, Nadezhda
 Kuban Offensive
 Kulak

 Return to Table of Contents

L 

 Latvian Riflemen
 League of Struggle for the Emancipation of the Working Class
 Left Socialist-Revolutionaries
 Left SR uprising
 Left-wing uprisings against the Bolsheviks
 Lenin, Vladimir
 Early life of Vladimir Lenin
 Government of Vladimir Lenin
 Revolutionary activity of Vladimir Lenin
 Leningrad
 Leninism
 Lenin's Hanging Order
 Lessons of October
 Liber, Mikhail
 Lunacharsky, Anatoly
 Lvov, Georgy

 Return to Table of Contents

M 

 Makhno, Nestor
 Malinovsky, Roman
 Martov, Julius
 Marxism
 Marxism–Leninism
 Masanchi, Magaza
 Materialism and Empirio-criticism
 Mayakovsky, Vladimir
 Mensheviks
 Military Revolutionary Committee
 Milyukov, Pavel
 Mossovet (Moscow Soviet of People's Deputies)
 Moscow
 Moscow Bolshevik Uprising
 Moscow State Conference
 Muromtsev, Sergey

 Return to Table of Contents

N 

 Narodnaya Volya
 Nicholas II of Russia
 Nikolaevich, Alexei
 Nikolaevich, Nicholas 
 Nogin, Viktor
 North Russia intervention

 Return to Table of Contents

O 

 October Manifesto
 Octoberists
 October Revolution
 Okhrana
 Orgburo

 Return to Table of Contents

P 

 Parvus, Alexander
 People's Will
 Pepelyayev, Anatoly
 Permanent revolution
 Petrograd
 Petrograd Military Revolutionary Committee
 Petrograd Soviet
 Plehve, Vyacheslav
 Plekhanov, Georgi
 Pogroms of the Russian Civil War
 Polish–Soviet War
 Politburo of the Communist Party of the Soviet Union
 Political Centre (Russia)
 Popular Socialists (Russia)
 Pravda
 Progressive Bloc (Russia)
 Pro-independence movements in the Russian Civil War
 Proletarian revolution
 Proletariat
 Provisional All-Russian Government
 Provisional Committee of the State Duma
 Provisional Priamurye Government
 Provisional Siberian Government (Vladivostok)
 Purishkevich, Vladimir
 Pyatakov, Georgy

 Return to Table of Contents

R 

 Rada
 Rasputin, Grigori
 Red Army
 Red Guards
 Red Terror
 Reed, John
 Revolt of the Czechoslovak Legion
 Revolutionary Insurrectionary Army of Ukraine
 Revolutions of 1917–1923 
 Revolutionary activity of Vladimir Lenin
 Revolutionary socialism
 Revolutionary tribunal (Russia)
 Romanian military intervention in Bessarabia
 Romanov, Michael Alexandrovich
 Romanov, Nikolai Alexandrovich
 Russian Civil War
 Russian Constituent Assembly
 Russian famine of 1921–22
 Russian Provisional Government
 Russian Revolution
 Russian Social Democratic Labour Party
 Russian Social Democratic Labour Party (of Internationalists)
 Russian Soviet Federative Socialist Republic
 Ruzsky, Nikolai

 Return to Table of Contents

S 

 Saint Petersburg
 Saint Petersburg Soviet
 St. Petersburg Workers' Organisation
 Second International
 Secretariat of the Communist Party of the Soviet Union
 Semyonov, Grigory Mikhaylovich
 Siberian intervention
 Shulgin, Vasily
 Socialist Revolutionary Party
 Sokolnikov, Grigori
 Southern Front of the Russian Civil War
 Soviet
 Soviet calendar
 Soviet Union
 Soviet westward offensive of 1918–19
 Sovnarkom
 SR Combat Organization
 Starving March
 Stasova, Elena
 State and Revolution, The
 State Duma (Russian Empire)
 April 1906 Russian legislative election
 January 1907 Russian legislative election
 October 1907 Russian legislative election
 November 1912 Russian legislative election
 Stolypin, Pyotr
 Stürmer, Boris
 Sverdlov, Yakov
 Sviatopolk-Mirsky, Pyotr

 Return to Table of Contents

T 

 Ten Days That Shook the World
 Treaty of Brest-Litovsk
 Treaty on the Creation of the USSR
 Trepov, Alexander
 Trepov, Dmitri Feodorovich
 Trial of the Socialist Revolutionaries
 Trotsky, Leon
 Trotskyism
 Trubetskoy, Sergei Petrovich
 Trudoviks
 Tsaritsyn
 Tsereteli, Irakli
 Tsvetaeva, Marina
 Turkestan Front
 Two Tactics of Social Democracy in the Democratic Revolution

 Return to Table of Contents

U 

 Ukrainian People's Republic
 Ukrainian Socialist-Revolutionary Party
 Ukrainian Soviet Socialist Republic
 Ulyanov, Aleksandr
 Union of October 17
 Union of Socialists-Revolutionaries Maximalists
 Ural Army

 Return to Table of Contents

V 

 Vanguardism
 Vikzhel
 Volunteer Army
 Vyborg Manifesto

 Return to Table of Contents

W 

 War communism
 What Is to Be Done?
 White Army
 White émigré
 White movement
 White Terror
 Witte, Sergei
 Women in the Russian Revolution
 World revolution
 World War I
 Wrangel's fleet
 Wrangel, Pyotr

 Return to Table of Contents

Y 

 Yakut revolt
 Yudenich, Nikolai

 Return to Table of Contents

Z 

 Zemstvo
 Zenzinov, Vladimir
 Zinoviev, Grigory
 Zhordania, Noe

 Return to Table of Contents

See also 
 Bibliography of the Russian Revolution and Civil War
 Index of Soviet Union-related articles (From the creation of the Soviet Union in 1922 until its dissolution in 1991)
 Timeline of Russian history
 Timeline of the Russian Civil War

 Return to Table of Contents

Notes

References

Russian Revolution
Soviet Union-related lists
Russia
Lists
Russia history-related lists